Stacy Seegars (born c. 1972) is a former American football offensive lineman. He attended Clemson University, where he was an All-American in 1993. Seegars was induced to the Clemson Athletics Hall of Fame in 2012.

Seegars was undrafted in 1994, but signed a free-agent contract with the Seattle Seahawks. He left the team for personal reasons, few days into training camp, and never played in the NFL.

References

1972 births
Living people
Players of American football from South Carolina
Clemson Tigers football players
Seattle Seahawks players
All-American college football players
People from Kershaw, South Carolina